The Damen Stan Lander 5612 (or Damen RoRo 5612) is a class of landing craft designed by Damen Group. The designation is based on the class's size of more than 57m in length and 12m as its beam.

The class equipped with a large loading crane, and can be used to transport dozens of standard-sized shipping containers. It has a landing craft-style bow loading ramp for wheeled vehicles, and it can carry a mixture of shipping containers and wheeled vehicles. It is designed with 16 crews.

The Bahamas, Bolivia, Venezuela, Panama and Vietnam are the operators of the class.

References 

Landing craft
Damen Group